Mornington Secondary College is a secondary school in Mornington, Victoria, Australia serving the communities of Somerville, Tyabb, Moorooduc, Mount Martha, and Mornington on the Mornington Peninsula and offers the Hands On Learning, The Victoria Police Youth Corp and Drum Corp, and many other extra-curricular programs to its students. MSC strives to achieve the best for students.

This particular college is well known for its sports swimming team, which is currently ranking at number 2 on the Australian leader boards. It also was the only state school in victoria to compete in the state inter-school athletics competition.

The schools motto is "Inspirational Learning on the Mornington Peninsula" and the Senior Schools mottos include "Dare to Dream" and "Honesty, Integrity and Work."

The current principal is Linda Stanton.
Vice Principals include: Jim Papas (Senior School), Michael Parker (Middle School), Denise Leggett (Junior School), and Jenny Mason (Student Wellbeing)

References

Public high schools in Victoria (Australia)
Buildings and structures in the Shire of Mornington Peninsula